Saleh Khan (also Romanized as Şāleḩ Khān) is a village in Dust Mohammad Rural District, in the Central District of Hirmand County, Sistan and Baluchestan Province, Iran. At the 2006 census, its population was 195, in 37 families.

References 

Populated places in Hirmand County